North Carolina's 23rd House district is one of 120 districts in the North Carolina House of Representatives. It has been represented by Democrat Shelly Willingham since 2015.

Geography
Since 2023, the district has included all of Edgecombe, Martin, and Bertie counties. The district overlaps with the 3rd and 5th Senate districts.

District officeholders since 1983

Multi-member district

Single-member district

Election results

2022

2020

2018

2016

2014

2012

2010

2008

2006

2004

2002

2000

References

North Carolina House districts
Edgecombe County, North Carolina
Martin County, North Carolina
Bertie County, North Carolina